Dieter Waskow (born 24 June 1957 in Rostock) is a German former diver who competed in the 1976 Summer Olympics and in the 1980 Summer Olympics.

References

1957 births
Living people
German male divers
Olympic divers of East Germany
Divers at the 1976 Summer Olympics
Divers at the 1980 Summer Olympics
Sportspeople from Rostock
20th-century German people